Hameed Tariq Ali (born August 26, 1993) is an American professional basketball player. He played college basketball for Texas A&M–Corpus before turning professional in 2016.

Professional career 
On August 8, 2016, Ali signed with Bristol Flyers of the British Basketball League. 

In March 2022, Ali played for the Senegalese DUC in the Basketball Africa League. On March 15, he set a new league record for most assists in a game when he had 15 assists versus AS Salé.

In July 2022, Ali joined the Venezuelan Brilliantes del Zulia of the Superliga Profesional de Baloncesto (SPB).

BAL career statistics

|-
|-
| style="text-align:left;"|2022
| style="text-align:left;"|DUC
| 5 || 5 || 29.9 || .406 || .310 || .857 || 4.0 || style="background:#cfecec;"| 8.4* || 1.8 || 0.2 || 15.4

References

External links

1993 births
Living people
DUC Dakar players

Bristol Flyers players
Caballeros de Culiacán players
Panteras de Aguascalientes players
Texas A&M–Corpus Christi Islanders men's basketball players
Al Sadd Doha basketball players